La'Tangela Chiquita Atkinson (born March 22, 1984) is an American professional women's basketball player in the Women's National Basketball Association (WNBA).

High school
Atkinson played for Lee Central High School in Bishopville, South Carolina, where she was named a WBCA All-American. She participated in the 2002 WBCA High School All-America Game where she scored eight points.

College
Atkinson attended college at the University of North Carolina and graduated in 2006.

North Carolina statistics
Source

Professional
Following her collegiate career, she was selected as the ninth overall pick in the 2006 WNBA Draft by the Indiana Fever.

On March 23, 2007, she was traded to the Sacramento Monarchs in exchange for the Monarchs' second round pick in the 2008 WNBA Draft.

Vital statistics
Position: Guard/Forward
Height: 6 ft 2 in (1.88 m)
College: University of North Carolina
Team(s): Indiana Fever, Sacramento Monarchs

References

External links
WNBA Player Profile
University of North Carolina Tar Heels player biography
Press release on her trade to the Sacramento Monarchs

1984 births
Living people
American women's basketball players
Basketball players from South Carolina
Indiana Fever draft picks
Indiana Fever players
North Carolina Tar Heels women's basketball players
People from Bishopville, South Carolina
Sacramento Monarchs players
Small forwards